Painted Bluffs Provincial Park is a provincial park in British Columbia, Canada, located on the north side of Kamloops Lake at the outlet of Copper Creek.

References

Provincial parks of British Columbia
Thompson Country
1996 establishments in British Columbia
Protected areas established in 1996